Jan van der Wiel (31 May 1892 – 24 November 1962) was a Dutch épée, foil and sabre fencer. He won a bronze medal at the 1920 Summer Olympics and the 1924 Summer Olympics in the team sabre competitions.

References

External links
 

1892 births
1962 deaths
Dutch male épée fencers
Olympic fencers of the Netherlands
Fencers at the 1920 Summer Olympics
Fencers at the 1924 Summer Olympics
Fencers at the 1928 Summer Olympics
Olympic bronze medalists for the Netherlands
Olympic medalists in fencing
Sportspeople from Breda
Medalists at the 1920 Summer Olympics
Medalists at the 1924 Summer Olympics
Dutch male foil fencers
Dutch male sabre fencers
20th-century Dutch people